Christine Marie Luche Gonzalez-Crisologo (born 28 May 1991), professionally known as Beauty Gonzalez, is a Filipina actress from Dumaguete.

Biography

Beauty Gonzalez was born as Christine Marie Gonzalez in Dumaguete to Carina Luche, a Spanish-Filipina who hails from Cebu and Ibarra Manuel González, a Spaniard.  Her father was a former professional Jai Alai player in Manila.  He had coconut and sugar cane farms in Pamplona, Negros Oriental.  Her mother comes from a political family in Cebu.  She has one older brother.  She attended St. Louis - Don Bosco and then Silliman University for college.  She later dropped out to join Pinoy Big Brother.

Prior to joining Pinoy Big Brother, she was once chosen as one of Cebu's 12 Prettiest Teens, and she was crowned the Miss Teen Philippines - Central Visayas in 2006.

Beauty gave birth to her daughter with Norman Crisologo in February 2016. They named her Olivia Ines.  Beauty and Norman, an art curator, became engaged in March 2017, and the couple married in May at a ceremony in Tagaytay.

Filmography

Television

Film

Awards and recognition

FHM 100 Sexiest Woman

References

Filipino television actresses
Filipino child actresses
Star Magic
Pinoy Big Brother contestants
1991 births
Living people
Filipino film actresses
21st-century Filipino actresses
Filipino female models
Filipina gravure idols
People from Dumaguete
Actresses from Negros Oriental
Silliman University alumni
ABS-CBN personalities
TV5 (Philippine TV network) personalities
GMA Network personalities